Excultanus is a genus of leafhoppers in the family Cicadellidae. There are about eight described species in Excultanus.

Species
These eight species belong to the genus Excultanus:
 Excultanus conus DeLong 1939 c g
 Excultanus dorothyae DeLong, 1939 c g b
 Excultanus excultus Uhler, 1877 c g b
 Excultanus hebraeus Ball 1918 c g
 Excultanus horridus DeLong 1944 c g
 Excultanus paraconus McKamey 2003 c g
 Excultanus parrai DeLong 1939 c g
 Excultanus plummeri DeLong 1939 c g
Data sources: i = ITIS, c = Catalogue of Life, g = GBIF, b = Bugguide.net

References

Further reading

External links

 

Phlepsiini
Cicadellidae genera